The 2009 Euro Beach Soccer Cup was the eleventh Euro Beach Soccer Cup, one of Europe's three major beach soccer championships of the 2009 beach soccer season, held in May 2009, in Rome, Italy.
Spain won the championship for the third time, with former champions Switzerland finishing second. Six time champions Portugal beat Hungary in the third place playoff to finish third and fourth respectively.

Eight teams participated in the tournament who played in a straightforward knockout tournament, starting with the quarterfinals, with extra matches deciding the nations who finished in fifth, sixth, seventh and eighth place.

Participating nations

Matches

Main tournament

Fifth to eighth place deciding matches
The following matches took place between the losing nations in the quarterfinals to determine the final standings of the nations finishing in fifth to eighth place. The semifinals took place on the same day of the semifinals of the main tournament and the playoffs took place on the day of the final.

Winners

Final standings

References

Euro Beach Soccer Cup
2009 in beach soccer